Thomas Alfred Ward (6 August 1917 – 1992) was an English footballer who scored 51 goals from 154 appearances in the Football League playing as a forward for Sheffield Wednesday and Darlington in the years following the Second World War.

Life and career
Ward was born in Wolsingham, County Durham, and played football for nearby Crook Town before signing for Football League Second Division club Sheffield Wednesday in March 1937. He never played for the first team before the Second World War, made a guest appearance for Leeds United in wartime football in 1945, and by the time the Football League resumed after the war, he was already 29 years old. He made his debut in the 1945–46 FA Cup, and contributed 18 goals from 28 league matches in the first post-war league season. Despite such a strong scoring record, Jimmy Dailey and then Clarrie Jordan were preferred in the following campaign. Ward played only seven more times, scoring once, and then returned to the north-east to sign for Third Division North club Darlington at the end of the season. He remained with the club for six years, and played 119 league matches in which he scored 32 goals. Alongside his football career, Ward worked as an undertaker.

Notes

References

1917 births
1992 deaths
People from Wolsingham
Footballers from County Durham
English footballers
Association football forwards
Crook Town A.F.C. players
Sheffield Wednesday F.C. players
Darlington F.C. players
English Football League players
Date of death missing